William Edward Tulip (3 May 1933 – December 2013) was an English former professional footballer who played in the Football League as a forward for Darlington between 1956 & 1958 before retiring due to injury.

References

External links
Profile at ENFA

1933 births
2013 deaths
Footballers from Gateshead
English footballers
Association football forwards
Newcastle United F.C. players
Darlington F.C. players
English Football League players